Le Grand Narbonne is the communauté d'agglomération, an intercommunal structure, centred on the city of Narbonne. It is located in the Aude department, in the Occitanie region, southern France. It was created in December 2002. Its seat is in Narbonne. Its area is 846.6 km2. Its population was 129,134 in 2017, of which 54,700 in Narbonne proper.

Composition
The communauté d'agglomération consists of the following 37 communes:

Argeliers
Armissan
Bages
Bizanet
Bize-Minervois
Caves
Coursan
Cuxac-d'Aude
Fleury
Ginestas
Gruissan
Leucate
Mailhac
Marcorignan
Mirepeisset
Montredon-des-Corbières
Moussan
Narbonne
Névian
Ouveillan
La Palme
Peyriac-de-Mer
Portel-des-Corbières
Port-la-Nouvelle
Pouzols-Minervois
Raissac-d'Aude
Roquefort-des-Corbières
Sainte-Valière
Saint-Marcel-sur-Aude
Saint-Nazaire-d'Aude
Sallèles-d'Aude
Salles-d'Aude
Sigean
Treilles
Ventenac-en-Minervois
Villedaigne
Vinassan

References

Agglomeration communities in France
Intercommunalities of Aude